Superman's mother may refer to:
Lara (comics), Superman's biological mother on Krypton
Martha Kent, Superman's adoptive mother on Earth